The North Dundas Rockets are a junior ice hockey team based out of Chesterville, Ontario.  They play in the National Capital Junior Hockey League.

History
The 2017–18 season was the best season up to that point for the Rockets as they took to second place in the league.  The team had league MVP and best defenceman in Bryden van Kessel; the rookie of the year with Justin Lefebvre, Executive of the Year in Robyn Sadler and the Coach(es) of the year with Nik Pass and Lenard McLean.

Season-by-season record
Note: GP = Games Played, W = Wins, L = Losses, T = Ties, OTL = Overtime Losses, GF = Goals for, GA = Goals against

References

External links
North Dundas Rockets Homepage

Eastern Ontario Junior C Hockey League teams
Ice hockey clubs established in 2011
2011 establishments in Ontario